Sandalus porosus is a species of cicada parasite beetle in the family Rhipiceridae. It is found in North America.

References

Further reading

 

Elateriformia
Articles created by Qbugbot
Beetles described in 1868